Paul Flussmann was a male Austrian international table tennis player.

Medal success
He won a bronze medals at the 1926 World Table Tennis Championships in the men's doubles with Munio Pillinger and silver medal in the men's team event. Two years later he won a silver medal at the 1928 World Table Tennis Championships in the men's team event and a bronze medal in the singles.

He won three more medals at team events before winning another bronze at the 1933 World Table Tennis Championships in the men's doubles with Erwin Kohn.

Coaching
He was of Jewish origin and established a club in Vienna where he coached leading players Richard Bergman, Karl Fischer, Jakob Tartakower and Ferry Weiss.

See also
 List of table tennis players
 List of World Table Tennis Championships medalists

References

Austrian male table tennis players
Jewish table tennis players
World Table Tennis Championships medalists